Luther Reily (October 17, 1794 – February 20, 1854) was a member of the U.S. House of Representatives from Pennsylvania.

Luther Reily was born in Myerstown, Pennsylvania.  He studied medicine and began practice in Harrisburg, Pennsylvania.  He held various local offices. During the War of 1812, he served as a private in Capt. R.M. Crane’s company of Pennsylvania Volunteers from August 3 to September 7, 1814, and as surgeon’s mate in Maj. Gen. R. Watson’s company from September 7 to December 5, 1814.

Reily was elected as a Democrat to the Twenty-fifth Congress.  He resumed the practice of his profession and died in Harrisburg in 1854.  Interment in Harrisburg Cemetery.

Sources

The Political Graveyard

External links

 

Burials at Harrisburg Cemetery
American militiamen in the War of 1812
Politicians from Harrisburg, Pennsylvania
Physicians from Pennsylvania
1794 births
1854 deaths
Democratic Party members of the United States House of Representatives from Pennsylvania
19th-century American politicians